Gangapur may refer to two places in Rajasthan.

 Gangapur City
 Gangapur, Bhilwara